Alpha and Omega is an appellation of Christ and God in the Book of Revelation.

Alpha and Omega and similar titles may also refer to:

Film, television, and radio
 Alpha and Omega (film series), a series of eight animated films produced by Crest Animation Productions
 Alpha and Omega (film), a 2010 animated comedy-drama film and a series of direct-to-DVD videos
 "Alpha and Omega" (Dark), a 2017 episode of Dark
 "Alpha and Omega" (Supernatural), a 2016 episode of Supernatural
 Alpha and Omega (radio plays), a pair of radio dramas by Mike Walker first aired by the BBC World Service in 2001 and 2002
 Alpha and Omega, the doomsday bomb in Beneath the Planet of the Apes
 Alpha-Omega, a military faction in War for the Planet of the Apes

Games
 Alpha and Omega, another name for the word game Word chain
 Alpha Omega (board game), a 1977 board wargame published by Battleline Publications
 Alpha Omega (role-playing game), developed by Mind Storm Labs
 Pokémon Omega Ruby and Alpha Sapphire, remakes of the Pokémon Japanese role-playing games Pokémon Ruby and Sapphire

Literature
 Alpha and Omega (Harrison), a 1915 collection of essays, lectures, and letters written by Jane Ellen Harrison
 Alpha & Omega (book), a 2003 book by Charles Seife
 Alpha and Omega, a 2007 novella by Patricia Briggs and the name for a series of subsequent novels
 Alpha & Omega, the final arc of the Locke & Key comic
 Omegaverse, a literary subgenre focusing on dynamics between characters labeled Alphas, Betas, and Omegas, popularized by slash fiction

Music 
 Alpha & Omega (band), a British dub/reggae duo
 Alpha & Omega Recording, the San Rafael, California recording studio of American music producer Sandy Pearlman
 Alpha and Omega (Bizzy Bone album), 2004
 Alpha and Omega (Tonus Peregrinus album), 2008
 Alpha Omega (Cro-Mags album), 1992
 Alpha Omega (Cheek album), 2015
 "Alpha Omega", a bootleg compilation of tracks by The Beatles which prompted the release of the official 1962–1966 and 1967–1970 compilations
 Danza IIII: The Alpha – The Omega, The Tony Danza Tapdance Extravaganza album, 2012
 "Alpha and Omega", a track off of Boards of Canada's 2002 album Geogaddi
 "Alpha and Omega", a track off of Architects' 2012 album Daybreaker
 "Alpha Omega", a track off of Karnivool's 2013 album Asymmetry

Other uses 
 Alpha and Omega, California gold rush towns, now honored as the historical landmark of Alpha Hydraulic Diggings
 Alpha et Omega, an occult order initially named the Hermetic Order of the Golden Dawn
 Alpha Omega (fraternity), a professional Jewish dental fraternity 
 Alpha Omega (local), a local men's residence at Grove City College

See also
 
 Alpha (disambiguation)
 AO (disambiguation)
 Omega (disambiguation)